The biblical apocrypha denotes the collection of apocryphal ancient books thought to have been written some time between 200 BC and AD 400. The Roman Catholic, Eastern Orthodox and Oriental Orthodox churches include some or all of the same texts within the body of their version of the Old Testament, terming them deuterocanonical books. Traditional 80-book Protestant Bibles include fourteen books in an intertestamental section between the Old Testament and New Testament called the Apocrypha, deeming these useful for instruction, but non-canonical. To this date, the Apocrypha are "included in the lectionaries of Anglican and Lutheran Churches". Anabaptists use the Luther Bible, which contains the Apocrypha as intertestamental books; Amish wedding ceremonies include "the retelling of the marriage of Tobias and Sarah in the Apocrypha". Moreover, the Revised Common Lectionary, in use by most mainline Protestants including Methodists and Moravians, lists readings from the Apocrypha in the liturgical calendar, although alternate Old Testament scripture lessons are provided.

Although the term apocryphal had been in use since the 5th century, it was in Luther's Bible of 1534 that the Apocrypha was first published as a separate intertestamental section. The preface to the Apocrypha in the Geneva Bible claimed that while these books "were not received by a common consent to be read and expounded publicly in the Church", and did not serve "to prove any point of Christian religion save in so much as they had the consent of the other scriptures called canonical to confirm the same", nonetheless, "as books proceeding from godly men they were received to be read for the advancement and furtherance of the knowledge of history and for the instruction of godly manners." Later, during the English Civil War, the Westminster Confession of 1647 excluded the Apocrypha from the canon and made no recommendation of the Apocrypha above "other human writings", and this attitude toward the Apocrypha is represented by the decision of the British and Foreign Bible Society in the early 19th century not to print it. Today, "English Bibles with the Apocrypha are becoming more popular again" and they are often printed as intertestamental books.

Many of these texts are considered canonical Old Testament books by the Catholic Church, affirmed by the Council of Rome (AD 382) and later reaffirmed by the Council of Trent (1545–63); and by the Eastern Orthodox Church which are referred to as anagignoskomena per the Synod of Jerusalem (1672). The Anglican Communion accepts "the Apocrypha for instruction in life and manners, but not for the establishment of doctrine (Article VI in the Thirty-Nine Articles)", and many "lectionary readings in The Book of Common Prayer are taken from the Apocrypha", with these lessons being "read in the same ways as those from the Old Testament". The first Methodist liturgical book, The Sunday Service of the Methodists, employs verses from the Apocrypha, such as in the Eucharistic liturgy. The Protestant Apocrypha contains three books (1 Esdras, 2 Esdras and the Prayer of Manasseh) that are accepted by many Eastern Orthodox Churches and Oriental Orthodox Churches as canonical, but are regarded as non-canonical by the Catholic Church and are therefore not included in modern Catholic Bibles.

Biblical canon

Vulgate prologues

Jerome completed his version of the Bible, the Latin Vulgate, in 405. The Vulgate manuscripts included prologues, in which Jerome clearly identified certain books of the older Old Latin Old Testament version as apocryphal – or non-canonical – even though they might be read as scripture.

In the prologue to the books of Samuel and Kings, which is often called the Prologus Galeatus, he says:

In the prologue to Ezra Jerome states that the third book and fourth book of Ezra are apocryphal; while the two books of Ezra in the Vetus Latina version, translating Ezra A and Ezra B of the Septuagint, are 'variant examples' of the same Hebrew original.

In his prologue to the books of Solomon, he says:

He mentions the book of Baruch in his prologue to Jeremiah but does not include it as 'apocrypha'; stating that "it is neither read nor held among the Hebrews".

In his prologue to Judith he mentions that "among the Hebrews, the authority [of Judith] came into contention", but that it was "counted in the number of Sacred Scriptures" by the First Council of Nicaea. In his reply to Rufinus, he affirmed that he was consistent with the choice of the church regarding which version of the deuterocanonical portions of Daniel to use, which the Jews of his day did not include:

According to Michael Barber, although Jerome was once suspicious of the apocrypha, he later viewed them as Scripture as shown in his epistles. Barber cites Jerome's letter to Eustochium, in which Jerome quotes Sirach 13:2.; elsewhere Jerome also refers to Baruch, the Story of Susannah and Wisdom as scripture.

Apocrypha in editions of the Bible

Apocrypha are well attested in surviving manuscripts of the Christian Bible. (See, for example, Codex Vaticanus, Codex Sinaiticus, Codex Alexandrinus, Vulgate, and Peshitta.) After the Lutheran and Catholic canons were defined by Luther (c. 1534) and Trent (8 April 1546) respectively, early Protestant editions of the Bible (notably the Luther Bible in German and 1611 King James Version in English) did not omit these books, but placed them in a separate Apocrypha section in between the Old and New Testaments to indicate their status.

Gutenberg Bible
This famous edition of the Vulgate was published in 1455. Like the manuscripts on which it was based, the Gutenberg Bible lacks a specific Apocrypha section. Its Old Testament includes the books that Jerome considered apocryphal and those Clement VIII later moved to the appendix. The Prayer of Manasseh is located after the Books of Chronicles, 3 and 4 Esdras follow 2 Esdras (Nehemiah), and Prayer of Solomon follows Ecclesiasticus.

Luther Bible

Martin Luther translated the Bible into German during the early part of the 16th century, first releasing a complete Bible in 1534. His Bible was the first major edition to have a separate section called Apocrypha. Books and portions of books not found in the Masoretic Text of Judaism were moved out of the body of the Old Testament to this section. Luther placed these books between the Old and New Testaments. For this reason, these works are sometimes known as inter-testamental books. The books 1 and 2 Esdras were omitted entirely. Luther was making a polemical point about the canonicity of these books. As an authority for this division, he cited St. Jerome, who in the early 5th century distinguished the Hebrew and Greek Old Testaments, stating that books not found in the Hebrew were not received as canonical. Although his statement was controversial in his day, Jerome was later titled a Doctor of the Church and his authority was also cited in the Anglican statement in 1571 of the Thirty-Nine Articles.

Luther also expressed some doubts about the canonicity of four New Testament books, although he never called them apocrypha: the Epistle to the Hebrews, the Epistles of James and Jude, and the Revelation to John.  He did not put them in a separately named section, but he did move them to the end of his New Testament.

Clementine Vulgate

In 1592, Pope Clement VIII published his revised edition of the Vulgate, referred to as the Sixto-Clementine Vulgate. He moved three books not found in the canon of the Council of Trent from the Old Testament into an appendix "lest they utterly perish" (ne prorsus interirent).

 Prayer of Manasseh
 3 Esdras (1 Esdras in the King James Bible)
 4 Esdras (2 Esdras in the King James Bible)

The protocanonical and deuterocanonical books he placed in their traditional positions in the Old Testament.

King James Version

The English-language King James Version (KJV) of 1611 followed the lead of the Luther Bible in using an inter-testamental section labelled "Books called Apocrypha", or just "Apocrypha" at the running page header. The KJV followed the Geneva Bible of 1560 almost exactly (variations are marked below).  The section contains the following:
1 Esdras (Vulgate 3 Esdras)
2 Esdras (Vulgate 4 Esdras)
Tobit
Judith ("Judeth" in Geneva)
Rest of Esther (Vulgate Esther 10:4 – 16:24)
Wisdom
Ecclesiasticus (also known as Sirach)
Baruch and the Epistle of Jeremy ("Jeremiah" in Geneva) (all part of Vulgate Baruch)
Song of the Three Children (Vulgate Daniel 3:24–90)
Story of Susanna (Vulgate Daniel 13)
The Idol Bel and the Dragon (Vulgate Daniel 14)
Prayer of Manasseh (Daniel)
1 Maccabees
2 Maccabees

(Included in this list are those books of the Clementine Vulgate that were not in Luther's canon).

These are the books most frequently referred to by the casual appellation "the Apocrypha". These same books are also listed in Article VI of the Thirty-Nine Articles of the Church of England. Despite being placed in the Apocrypha, in the table of lessons at the front of some printings of the King James Bible, these books are included under the Old Testament.

The Bible and the Puritan revolution
The British Puritan revolution of the 1600s brought a change in the way many British publishers handled the apocryphal material associated with the Bible. The Puritans used the standard of Sola Scriptura (Scripture Alone) to determine which books would be included in the canon. The Westminster Confession of Faith, composed during the British Civil Wars (1642–1651), excluded the Apocrypha from the canon. The Confession provided the rationale for the exclusion: 'The books commonly called Apocrypha, not being of divine inspiration, are no part of the canon of the Scripture, and therefore are of no authority in the church of God, nor to be any otherwise approved, or made use of, than other human writings' (1.3). Thus, Bibles printed by English Protestants who separated from the Church of England began to exclude these books.

Other early Bible editions
All English translations of the Bible printed in the sixteenth century included a section or appendix for Apocryphal books. Matthew's Bible, published in 1537, contains all the Apocrypha of the later King James Version in an inter-testamental section. The 1538 Myles Coverdale Bible contained an Apocrypha that excluded Baruch and the Prayer of Manasseh. The 1560 Geneva Bible placed the Prayer of Manasseh after 2 Chronicles; the rest of the Apocrypha were placed in an inter-testamental section. The Douay-Rheims Bible (1582–1609) placed the Prayer of Manasseh and 3 and 4 Esdras into an Appendix of the second volume of the Old Testament.

In the Zürich Bible (1529–30), they are placed in an Appendix. They include 3 Maccabees, along with 1 Esdras & 2 Esdras. The 1st edition omitted the Prayer of Manasseh and the Rest of Esther, although these were included in the 2nd edition. The French Bible (1535) of Pierre Robert Olivétan placed them between the Testaments, with the subtitle, "The volume of the apocryphal books contained in the Vulgate translation, which we have not found in the Hebrew or Chaldee".

In 1569 the Spanish Reina Bible, following the example of the pre-Clementine Latin Vulgate, contained the deuterocanonical books in its Old Testament. Following the other Protestant translations of its day, Valera's 1602 revision of the Reina Bible moved these books into an inter-testamental section.

Modern editions
All King James Bibles published before 1666 included the Apocrypha, though separately to denote them as not equal to Scripture proper, as noted by Jerome in the Vulgate, to which he gave the name, "The Apocrypha". In 1826, the National Bible Society of Scotland petitioned the British and Foreign Bible Society not to print the Apocrypha, resulting in a decision that no BFBS funds were to pay for printing any Apocryphal books anywhere. They reasoned that not printing the Apocrypha within the Bible would prove to be less costly to produce. Since that time most modern editions of the Bible and reprintings of the King James Bible omit the Apocrypha section. Modern non-Catholic reprintings of the Clementine Vulgate commonly omit the Apocrypha section. Many reprintings of older versions of the Bible now omit the apocrypha and many newer translations and revisions have never included them at all.

There are some exceptions to this trend, however. Some editions of the Revised Standard Version and the New Revised Standard Version of the Bible include not only the Apocrypha listed above, but also 3 Maccabees, 4 Maccabees, and Psalm 151.

The American Bible Society lifted restrictions on the publication of Bibles with the Apocrypha in 1964.  The British and Foreign Bible Society followed in 1966. The Stuttgart Vulgate (the printed edition, not most of the on-line editions), which is published by the UBS, contains the Clementine Apocrypha as well as the Epistle to the Laodiceans and Psalm 151.

Brenton's edition of the Septuagint includes all of the Apocrypha found in the King James Bible with the exception of 2 Esdras, which was not in the Septuagint and is no longer extant in Greek. He places them in a separate section at the end of his Old Testament, following English tradition.

In Greek circles, however, these books are not traditionally called Apocrypha, but Anagignoskomena (ἀναγιγνωσκόμενα), and are integrated into the Old Testament. The Orthodox Study Bible, published by Thomas Nelson Publishers, includes the Anagignoskomena in its Old Testament, with the exception of 4 Maccabees. This was translated by the Saint Athanasius Academy of Orthodox Theology, from the Rahlfs Edition of the Septuagint using Brenton's English translation and the RSV Expanded Apocrypha as their standardized text. As such, they are included in the Old Testament with no distinction between these books and the rest of the Old Testament. This follows the tradition of the Eastern Orthodox Church where the Septuagint is the received version of Old Testament scripture, considered itself inspired in agreement with some of the Fathers, such as St Augustine, rather than the Hebrew Masoretic text followed by all other modern translations.

Anagignoskomena
The Septuagint, the ancient and best known Greek version of the Old Testament, contains books and additions that are not present in the Hebrew Bible. These texts are not traditionally segregated into a separate section, nor are they usually called apocrypha. Rather, they are referred to as the Anagignoskomena (ἀναγιγνωσκόμενα, "things that are read" or "profitable reading"). The anagignoskomena are Tobit, Judith, Wisdom of Solomon, Wisdom of Jesus ben Sira (Sirach), Baruch, Letter of Jeremiah (in the Vulgate this is chapter 6 of Baruch), additions to Daniel (The Prayer of Azarias, Susanna and Bel and the Dragon), additions to Esther, 1 Maccabees, 2 Maccabees, 3 Maccabees, 1 Esdras, i.e. all of the Deuterocanonical books plus 3 Maccabees and 1 Esdras.

Some editions add additional books, such as Psalm 151 or the Odes (including the Prayer of Manasseh). 2 Esdras is added as an appendix in the Slavonic Bibles and 4 Maccabees as an appendix in Greek editions.

Pseudepigrapha
Technically, a pseudepigraphon is a book written in a biblical style and ascribed to an author who did not write it. In common usage, however, the term pseudepigrapha is often used by way of distinction to refer to apocryphal writings that do not appear in printed editions of the Bible, as opposed to the texts listed above. Examples include:
Apocalypse of Abraham
Apocalypse of Moses
Letter of Aristeas
Martyrdom and Ascension of Isaiah
Joseph and Aseneth
Life of Adam and Eve
Lives of the Prophets
Ladder of Jacob
Jannes and Jambres
History of the Captivity in Babylon
History of the Rechabites
Eldad and Modad
History of Joseph the Carpenter
Odes of Solomon
Prayer of Joseph
Prayer of Jacob
Vision of Ezra

Often included among the pseudepigrapha are 3 and 4 Maccabees because they are not traditionally found in western Bibles, although they are in the Septuagint. Similarly, the Book of Enoch, Book of Jubilees and 4 Baruch are often listed with the pseudepigrapha although they are commonly included in Ethiopian Bibles.  The Psalms of Solomon are found in some editions of the Septuagint.

Cultural impact
 The introitus, "Eternal rest grant unto them, O Lord, and let perpetual light shine upon them", of the traditional Requiem in the Catholic Church is loosely based on 4 Esdras 2:34–35.
 The alternative introitus for Quasimodo Sunday in the Roman rite of the Catholic Church is loosely based on 4 Esdras 2:36–37.
 The Story of Susanna is perhaps the earliest example of a courtroom drama, and perhaps the first example of an effective forensic cross-examination (there are no others in the Bible: except perhaps Solomon's judgement at 1 Kings 3:25).
 Bel and the Dragon is perhaps the earliest example of a locked room mystery.
 Shylock's reference in The Merchant of Venice to "A Daniel come to judgment; yea, a Daniel!" refers to the story of Susanna and the elders.
 The theme of the elders surprising Susanna in her bath is a common one in art, such as in paintings by Tintoretto and Artemisia Gentileschi, and in Wallace Stevens' poem Peter Quince at the Clavier.
 Let Us Now Praise Famous Men, the title of James Agee's 1941 chronicle of Alabama sharecroppers, was taken from Ecclesiasticus 44:1: "Let us now praise famous men, and our fathers that begat us."
 In his spiritual autobiography Grace Abounding to the Chief of Sinners, John Bunyan recounts how God strengthened him against the temptation to despair of his salvation by inspiring him with the words, "Look at the generations of old and see: did any ever trust in God, and were confounded?"

See also 
 Jewish apocrypha
 New Testament apocrypha
 Pseudepigrapha

References

Further reading
Texts
 Robert Holmes and James Parsons, Vet. Test. Graecum cum var. lectionibus (Oxford, 1798–1827)
 Henry Barclay Swete, Old Testament in Greek, i.-iii. (Cambridge, 1887–1894)
 Otto Fridolinus Fritzsche, Libri Apocryphi V. T. Graece (1871)

Commentaries
 O. F. Fritzsche and Grimm, Kurzgef. exeget. Handbuch zu den Apok. des A.T. (Leipzig, 1851–1860)
 Edwin Cone Bissell, Apocrypha of the Old Testament (Edinburgh, 1880)
 Otto Zöckler, Die Apokryphen des Alten Testaments (Munchen, 1891)
 Henry Wace, The Apocrypha ("Speaker's Commentary") (1888)

Introductions
 Emil Schürer, Geschichte des jüdischen Volkes, vol. iii. 135 sqq., and his article on "Apokryphen" in Herzog's Realencykl. i. 622–53
 
 Metzger, Bruce M. An Introduction to the Apocrypha. [Pbk. ed.]. New York: Oxford University Press, 1977, cop. 1957.

External links
"The Apocrypha, Bridge of the Testaments" by Robert C. Dentan
"Lutheran Cyclopedia: Apocrypha" at lcms.org
"Apocrypha" in the Catholic Encyclopaedia at newadvent.org/cathen

 Biblical apocrypha
Deuterocanonical books
Development of the Christian biblical canon